The USA Gymnastics sex abuse scandal relates to the sexual abuse of gymnasts—primarily minors at the time of the abuse—over two decades in the United States, starting in the 1990s. More than 368 people alleged that they were sexually assaulted "by gym owners, coaches, and staff working for gymnastics programs across the country". Longtime USA Gymnastics (USAG) national team doctor Larry Nassar was specifically named in hundreds of lawsuits filed by athletes who said that Nassar engaged in sexual abuse for at least 14 years under the pretense of providing medical treatment. Since the scandal was first reported by The Indianapolis Star in September 2016, more than 265 women, including former USAG national team members Jessica Howard, Jamie Dantzscher, Morgan White, Jeanette Antolin, McKayla Maroney, Aly Raisman, Maggie Nichols, Gabby Douglas, Simone Biles, Jordyn Wieber, Sabrina Vega, Ashton Locklear, Kyla Ross, Madison Kocian, Amanda Jetter, Tasha Schwikert, Mattie Larson, Bailie Key, Kennedy Baker, Alyssa Baumann, and Terin Humphrey have accused Nassar of sexually assaulting them. It is considered the largest sexual abuse scandal in sports history.

On July 11, 2017, Nassar pleaded guilty to federal child pornography charges, and was sentenced to 60 years in prison on December 7, 2017. On November 22, 2017, he pleaded guilty in state court to seven charges of first-degree sexual assault and entered another guilty plea a week later to three additional charges of sexual assault. On January 24, 2018, Nassar was sentenced to an additional 40 to 175 years in prison, set to run after Nassar serves the 60-year federal prison sentence for child pornography. On February 5, 2018, Nassar received another 40 to 125 years. , he is incarcerated at US Penitentiary, Coleman.

An investigation by The Indianapolis Star over a period of nine months found that the abuses were widespread because "predatory coaches were allowed to move from gym to gym, undetected by a lax system of oversight, or dangerously passed on by USA Gymnastics-certified gyms". USAG and Michigan State University (MSU)—where Nassar worked as its osteopathic physician—have been accused of enabling Nassar's abuse and are named as defendants in civil lawsuits that former gymnasts have filed against Nassar. Besides Nassar, other coaches were involved in the scandal in Michigan, Pennsylvania, California, Rhode Island, Indiana, and elsewhere.

On May 16, 2018, it was announced that the victims would be awarded the Arthur Ashe Courage Award. On December 13 that year, the National Collegiate Athletic Association (NCAA) awarded Nichols, the first person to have reported Nassar (though not the first to go public with her report), the Inspiration Award for 2019.

Background
In 1990, USAG compiled a list of permanently banned coaches, including coaches banned for sexual abuse. In 1992, Robert Dean Head, a USAG coach in Kentucky, pled guilty to raping a 12-year-old. In 2007, USAG made background checks mandatory for all coaches. Don Peters, the national coach for the 1984 Olympic team, was banned from USAG in 2011, after two former gymnasts accused him of sexual abuse. In 2016, Olympic team doctor Larry Nassar was arrested on charges of sex abuse and possession of child pornography. Multiple victims of sexual abuse have filed lawsuits against USAG and other parties.

In several incidents, USAG dismissed warnings about coaches. In a 2013 lawsuit, USAG officials admitted under oath that allegations of sexual abuse were routinely dismissed as hearsay unless they came directly from a victim or victim's parent. USAG waited for four years before reporting Marvin Sharp to the police. Sharp was named USAG Coach in 2010. In 2015, he was charged with three counts of child molestation and four counts of sexual misconduct with a minor. He was charged and committed suicide in prison. Gymnastic coach Mark Schiefelbein was charged in 2002 for molesting a 10-year-old girl. After prosecutors subpoenaed records, they learned that USAG had received prior complaints against Schiefelbein, who was convicted and is serving a 36-year sentence. A complaint had been filed about James Bell at least five years before he was arrested in 2003 for molesting three young gymnasts. Bell pleaded guilty and is serving eight years in prison.

At least four complaints were made against Georgia coach William McCabe, but USAG did not report the allegations to the police. One gym owner had warned that McCabe "should be locked in a cage before someone is raped". McCabe continued coaching for seven years until one gymnast's mother went to the Federal Bureau of Investigation (FBI) with emails that he sent to her 11-year-old daughter. McCabe was charged with molesting gymnasts, secretly videotaping girls changing clothes, and posting their nude images on the Internet. He pleaded guilty and is serving a 30-year sentence. 
 
A judge released over 5,600 pages of court records in the McCabe case after Marisa Kwiatkowski from the Indianapolis Star requested the documents. These documents show how USAG has responded to various sexual misconduct allegations that were made against coaches over a 10-year period from 1996 to 2006. The released documents included a letter which says a USAG regional chair spoke to the organization's president in support of allowing a convicted sex offender to keep his membership. Other documents include sexual abuse complaints that were filed against 54 coaches. The documents revealed that some of these coaches were not banned from the sport even after being convicted of the crimes. USAG has since said that it has banned 37 of the 54 coaches.

In a deposition, USAG President Steve Penny said: "To the best of my knowledge, there's no duty to report if you are—if you are a third-party to some allegation [...]. You know, that lies with the person who has first-hand knowledge." Penny resigned in March 2017.

Nassar was a licensed osteopathic physician and the national team sports-medicine doctor for USAG. He ran a clinic and gymnastics club at MSU, where he was a faculty member. USAG fired Nassar in 2015 "after learning of athlete concerns".

Sexual abuse allegations
In September 2016, The Indianapolis Star reported that Rachael Denhollander was one of two former gymnasts who had made accusations of sexual abuse against Nassar. Following those criminal complaints, MSU reassigned Nassar from his clinical and teaching duties and fired him later that month. Since then, over 250 women and girls have accused Nassar of sexually abusing them; many of them were minors at the time of the crimes.

According to those reports, Nassar committed sexual assaults during medical examinations and purported treatments. The molestations ranged from his inserting a finger into the gymnasts' vaginas and anuses to fondling their breasts and genitalia. These were criminal acts regardless of consent since the victims were minors. Nassar initially denied the charges, claiming that he was performing legitimate medical procedures. In February 2017, three former gymnasts—Jeanette Antolin, Jessica Howard, and Jamie Dantzscher—gave an interview with 60 Minutes in which they accused Nassar of sexually abusing them. The gymnasts also alleged that the "emotionally abusive environment" at the national team training camps run by Béla and Márta Károlyi at the Karolyi Ranch near Huntsville, Texas, gave Nassar an opportunity to take advantage of the gymnasts and made them afraid to speak up about the abuse. Rachael Denhollander, one of the first women to publicly accuse Nassar, said in court in May 2017 that Nassar sexually abused her on five doctor's visits in 2000 when she was 15 years old.

Olympic gold medalist McKayla Maroney, using the #MeToo hashtag on Twitter, stated that Nassar repeatedly molested her, starting in 2008 when she was 13 years old and continuing until she retired from the sport in 2016. Maroney filed a lawsuit against Nassar, MSU, the US Olympic Committee (USOC), and USAG. The lawsuit accused USAG of covering up the sexual abuse by paying Maroney a $1.25-million settlement that required her to sign a non-disclosure agreement.

During a 60 Minutes interview, Olympic gold medalist Aly Raisman also accused Nassar of sexually abusing her. Raisman stated that Nassar molested her when she was 15 years of age. Gabby Douglas drew criticism from fellow Olympic teammate Simone Biles and others for sending a tweet that they interpreted as criticizing Raisman and of "victim-shaming", stating that "dressing in a provocative/sexual way incites the wrong crowd". Douglas later apologized for the tweet and said she was also a victim of Nassar's abuse.

Former national team member Maggie Nichols accused Nassar of abusing her and documented the ways he "groomed" her by connecting with her on Facebook and complimenting her appearance on numerous occasions. It was also reported that it was Nichols' coach, Sarah Jantzi, who first reported Nassar to USAG on June 17, 2015, after overhearing Nichols talk to other gymnasts, later revealed to be Raisman and Alyssa Baumann, about Nassar's behavior. Simone Biles came forward shortly after with firsthand accounts of how she too had been sexually abused by Nassar. Jordyn Wieber made a statement at Nassar's court sentencing in which she also accused Nassar of sexually abusing her during her time at USAG. On May 1, 2018, former national team member Sabrina Vega also accused Nassar of sexual abuse, claiming she was abused hundreds of times, beginning when she was 12. In August 2018, UCLA gymnasts and 2012 and 2016 Olympians Kyla Ross and Madison Kocian came forward as victims of Nassar. The following month, Alabama Crimson Tide gymnasts Bailie Key and Amanda Jetter also came forward with accusations against Nassar. In October, Tasha Schwikert, a member of the 2000 US Olympics team, came forward as a victim and claimed that Steve Penny pressed her to publicly support USAG at the height of the Nassar scandal. In November, Florida Gators gymnasts Kennedy Baker and Baumann made public allegations against Nassar; Baker said she was abused during the 2012 Olympic Trials.

Criminal proceedings

Larry Nassar

In November 2016, Nassar was charged with sexual assault of a child. Michigan attorney general Bill Schuette stated that the assaults began when the victim was 6 years old in 1998 and lasted until 2005. He pleaded not guilty to three charges of first-degree criminal sexual conduct against a minor during his first court appearance.

The following month, Nassar was indicted on federal child pornography charges. According to the FBI, over 37,000 images and videos of child pornography were seized from Nassar's home, including a GoPro video of Nassar allegedly molesting girls in a swimming pool. Some of the material was found on a hard drive and disks that Nassar discarded in his trash bin outside his home. Nassar pleaded guilty to three federal child pornography charges on July 11, 2017, and was given three consecutive 20-year prison sentences by U.S. District Judge Janet T. Neff on December 7, 2017.

On November 15, 2017, it was reported that Nassar pleaded guilty to counts of sexual assault in Ingham County (which contains most of East Lansing, the home city for Michigan State) and Eaton County in Michigan. At the time, he faced a total of 22 charges, 15 in Ingham and 7 in Eaton. Among the allegations was that under the guise of providing legitimate treatment, he molested 7 girls at his home and at a clinic on the MSU campus. It also stated that Nassar would enter a guilty plea in Ingham County on November 22 and would then plead guilty in Eaton County on November 29 and would serve at least 25 years in prison for these crimes. Others who reported assaults by Nassar to the police were permitted to make victim impact statements during his sentencing hearing.

During his appearance before Judge Rosemarie Aquilina in Ingham County Circuit Court, and under the terms of his plea agreement, Nassar pleaded guilty to seven counts of criminal sexual conduct charges with a minimum sentence of 25 to 40 years in prison. Three of the victims were under the age of 13 and three ranged in age from 13 to 15. Nassar issued a short statement in which he apologized and said that he was hopeful the community could move forward: 
"For all those involved, I'm so horribly sorry that this was like a match that turned into a forest fire out of control. I have no animosity toward anyone. I just want healing. [...] We need to move forward in a sense of growth and healing and I pray [for] that [...]."

More than 150 women made impact statements during Nassar's week-long sentencing hearing before the former doctor was sentenced on January 24, 2018, to state prison for 40 to 175 years. During his federal sentencing, Judge Neff had previously ordered that any state prison term run consecutive with Nassar's federal sentence. Judge Aquilina quoted a letter that Nassar had sent her prior to sentencing, in which he blamed his accusers. She described him as a dangerous individual who showed little remorse and said that she "signed [his] death warrant".

During his Eaton County Circuit Court appearance, Nassar pleaded guilty to engaging in sexual misconduct with three children under the age of 16. On February 5, 2018, Judge Janet Cunningham sentenced Nassar to an additional 40 to 125 years in state prison. This sentence will run consecutive to Nassar's federal sentence but concurrent to his previous state sentence from Ingham County.

Steve Penny
On October 17, 2018, former USAG CEO Steve Penny was arrested on charge of evidence tampering in the Larry Nassar case. He was accused of removing documents linked to the Nassar sexual abuse case from the Karolyi Ranch gymnastics training facility in Texas. On October 29, 2018, Penny entered a plea of not guilty.  In April 2022 the evidence tampering charges against Penny were dropped.

Lou Anna Simon
On November 20, 2018, former MSU president Lou Anna Simon was charged with two felonies and two misdemeanor counts for lying to the police. She is accused of falsely telling investigators she did not know the nature of a Title IX complaint against Nassar in 2014. She could face up to four years in prison on each felony charge.

On October 29, 2019, Eaton County District Court Judge Julie Reincke ruled there was sufficient evidence to bind Simon over for trial in Eaton County circuit court.

On May 13, 2020, Eaton County Judge John Maurer dismissed the charges against Simon. The Michigan Attorney General's Office said it planned to appeal.

Kathie Klages
In August 2018, Kathie Klages, a former MSU gymnastics coach, was charged with one felony count and one misdemeanor count of lying to the police about her early knowledge of sexual abuse allegations against Nassar. Her trial began in February 2020. She was found guilty on two counts of lying to the police and faces up to four years in prison. Her sentencing was set for April 18, 2020, but was rescheduled to July 15 of that year; however, the sentencing was once again delayed due to a water main break near the courthouse. On August 4, Klages was sentenced to 90 days in jail and 18 months of probation.

John Geddert
On February 25, 2021, John Geddert, the head coach of the 2012 US Women's Olympic Gymnastics Team, was charged with multiple felonies including 20 counts of human trafficking and forced labor, one count of first-degree sexual assault, one count of second-degree sexual assault, racketeering and lying to a police officer. Geddert died by suicide shortly after his charges were announced to the public.

Response and impact

USAG
With regard to the USAG sex abuse scandal, in 2016, USAG stated that "Nothing is more important to USA Gymnastics, the Board of Directors and CEO Steve Penny than protecting athletes, which requires sustained vigilance by everyone—coaches, athletes, parents, administrators and officials. We are saddened when any athlete has been harmed in the course of his or her gymnastics career". The USAG also said that it required criminal background checks for all of its coaches. An independent investigation by The Indianapolis Star, however, found that "some coaches are fired at gym after gym without being tracked or flagged by USA Gymnastics, or losing their membership with the organization".

Specifically with regard to Nassar, USAG said that its executives first learned of an athlete's concern regarding him in June 2015. Following an internal investigation, Nassar was fired and reported to the FBI the next month. In March 2017, USAG president Steve Penny resigned amid accusations of negligence and calls for his dismissal. In response to the scandal, USAG adopted reforms based on a June 2017 report by an investigator hired to review the organization's policies and practices. One of the changes is a requirement that all USAG members report any suspected sexual misconduct to appropriate authorities and the US Center for SafeSport.

USAG has been criticized for its handling of the sexual abuse allegations against Nassar. According to a 2016 investigation reported by The Indianapolis Star, top executives at USAG routinely dismissed sexual abuse allegations against coaches and failed to alert authorities. Senators criticized the organization's leadership for waiting five weeks before reporting Nassar to law enforcement, after hearing allegations involving him in 2015. Juliet Macur of The New York Times was critical of USAG for not attending the 2017 congressional hearing on protecting young athletes from sexual abuse, and noted that the organization had not apologized for its role in the scandal. The two time Olympian Aly Raisman criticized USAG's response to the scandal, noting that the reported $1-million severance package given to former president Penny could have been used to create a program to help the affected athletes.

Amid the sex abuse scandal, USAG lost several major corporate sponsors, including Procter & Gamble, Kellogg's, Under Armour, The Hershey Company, and AT&T. Procter & Gamble was the name sponsor of the National Championships for five seasons, AT&T sponsored the American Cup since 2011, and Kellogg's sponsored a series of nationwide tours. Marketing revenues account for approximately 35 percent of USAG annual revenues, or about $9.4 million. Kellogg's and Procter & Gamble were two of the largest sponsors associated with the organization. These actions, however, impacted and damaged the athletes (who lost necessary funding) to a larger extent compared to the organization.

In January 2018, USAG officially cut ties with Karolyi Ranch, the former national training center for the national team and a site where Nassar sexually assaulted many gymnasts. Later that month the Karolyi Ranch announced on its website that the facility had permanently closed. On January 22, 2018, three members of the USAG Board of Directors resigned.

Following Nassar's sentencing on January 24, 2018, the USOC published an open letter calling for the resignations of the remaining USAG Board of Directors, saying that failure to comply with the request would result in the USOC taking steps to decertify the governing body. The USOC also announced that it was launching a third-party investigation into the scandal. On January 31, USAG received resignations from every member of its board of directors, complying with USOC's demands.

On February 1, it was reported that the USOC had been informed of abuse claims in 2015, prior to when they claimed they first heard it in 2016. Reports surfaced that USAG President Steve Penny had called USOC Chief Executive Scott Blackmun in July 2015 to inform him that an investigation uncovered possible criminal behavior by Nassar against Olympic athletes. Additionally in September 2015, Penny emailed USOC Security Chief detailing the allegations against Nassar.

John Geddert, team coach of the 2012 London Olympic team and personal coach of Jordyn Wieber, retired following an announcement by USAG that he had been suspended as a result of his connection to Nassar. Geddert operated two gyms that employed Nassar, including Twistars. Ownership of Twistars has been transferred to Geddert's wife Katherine. Gymnasts have reported being abused by Nassar at Twistars. Gymnasts have also accused Geddert of being abusive and dismissive of their injuries. One gymnast said Geddert had thrown her onto the low bar hard enough to tear the muscles in her stomach and end her career. They have said that Geddert's abuse left them vulnerable to Nassar's manipulation.

On February 2, Valeri Liukin resigned as national team coordinator. Later that month, the USOC CEO Scott Blackmun also resigned.

On February 28, Raisman filed a lawsuit against USAG and the USOC, claiming both organizations "knew or should have known" about the ongoing abuse. On May 1, former national team member Sabrina Vega sued USAG, the USOC, and Béla and Márta Károlyi, claiming they ignored signs about Nassar's behavior or should have known he posed a risk to the gymnasts he treated.

On September 4, USAG CEO and President, Kerry Perry, resigned. This came after USOC CEO Sarah Hirshland called for a change in USAG leadership and the US Elite Coaches Association called for a vote of no confidence in Perry. On October 12, Mary Bono was appointed interim president and chief executive officer of USAG. She resigned four days later after many people, including Raisman and Biles, expressed criticism over choosing Bono as interim president due to her ties with her former law firm, Faegre Baker Daniels, the same firm that helped cover up Nassar's crimes.

On November 5, 2018, the USOC announced that it was starting the process to decertify USAG as the national governing body for gymnastics in the US. One month later, USAG filed for bankruptcy.

On February 29, 2020, gymnasts Simone Biles and Aly Raisman expressed anger over a proposed settlement by the US Olympic & Paralympic Committee (USOPC) in the sexual abuse scandal. The proposed $215-million settlement (half of what MSU paid) will stop all lawsuits and prevent further investigation into the coverup.

MSU
MSU said that it first received a complaint against Nassar in 2014. A Title IX investigation into the complaint found no violation of policy and Nassar was allowed to continue treating patients under certain agreed upon restrictions, as stipulated by MSU College of Osteopathic Medicine Dean William Strampel. However, no monitoring was instituted. After allegations against Nassar were reported by The Indianapolis Star in September 2016, Nassar was fired by Michigan State for violating the 2014 agreement.

The university faces lawsuits from 144 local and MSU athletes who say they were sexually assaulted by Larry Nassar. MSU gymnastics coach Kathie Klages was suspended on February 13, 2017, and retired the next day, amidst the sexual abuse investigation of Nassar. Klages has been accused of dismissing sexual abuse complaints by former gymnasts against Nassar and pressuring them to stay silent. According to court documents, Klages was reportedly aware of sexual abuse allegations against Nassar as early as 1997.

On December 12, 2017, Strampel resigned as dean and went on medical leave as faculty. After mediation ended in the civil lawsuits, the MSU Board of Trustees voted to establish a $10-million fund to reimburse Nassar's victims for counseling services. MSU President Lou Anna Simon also apologized to the Nassar victims and donated her just-approved raise to the Roy J. and Lou Anna K. Simon Scholarship fund.

During Nassar's sentencing in January 2018, eight former MSU athletes, including those from the gymnastics, softball, volleyball, rowing, and track and field programs, gave victim impact statements accusing MSU staff of dismissing their sexual abuse complaints against Nassar.

On January 23, 2018, the National Collegiate Athletic Association formally opened an investigation into the university's handling of sexual abuse allegations against Nassar. On January 24, 2018, amid backlash over the university's role in the scandal, the Michigan House of Representatives voted overwhelmingly for a non-binding resolution sponsored by Rep. Adam Zemke, that called for the university's Board of Trustees to fire President Lou Anna Simon if she did not resign. Simon resigned later that same day. Two days later, MSU athletic director Mark Hollis retired.

Several other investigations by state and federal agencies into Michigan State's involvement are ongoing, including by the Michigan Attorney General's office and the US Department of Education.

As a result of the Michigan Attorney General's investigation, in March 2018, William Strampel, who oversaw Nassar's clinic while dean of the College of Osteopathic Medicine, was arrested and charged with felony misconduct in office and criminal sexual conduct for allegedly groping a student and storing nude photos on his computer. Strampel also possessed a video of the pelvic floor manipulation procedure that Larry Nassar had created as a training video. The video may constitute evidence of an assault, and the investigation is continuing. On June 9, 2018, six current or former Michigan State employees linked to Nassar became the subjects of an investigation by Michigan's Department of Licensing and Regulatory Affairs.

On May 16, 2018, it was reported that the MSU and Nassar's victims reached a $500-million settlement.

Congress
Congress responded to the sexual abuse claims made against Nassar and also to claims made against personnel who were involved with USA Swimming and USA Taekwondo. Senator Dianne Feinstein introduced a bill to require national governing body members overseeing Olympic sports to immediately report sexual assault allegations to law enforcement or designated child-welfare agencies. Former gymnasts Dominique Moceanu, Jamie Dantzscher, and Jessica Howard testified at a Senate Judiciary Committee hearing on March 28, 2017, concerning the bill. Rick Adams, chief of Paralympic sports for the USOC and head of organizational development for the NGBs, stated at the hearing: "We do take responsibility, and we apologize to any young athlete who has ever faced abuse." USAG was asked to testify at the hearing, but declined.

The Protecting Young Victims from Sexual Abuse and Safe Sport Authorization Act of 2017, a bipartisan bill sponsored by Senators Dianne Feinstein and John Thune and others, was agreed to in the House of Representatives on January 29, 2018. The bill was agreed to in the Senate on January 30, 2018, and became law on February 14, 2018, when it was signed by President Donald J. Trump. Among other things, the law requires Olympic governing bodies and amateur sports organizations to report sex-abuse allegations immediately to local or federal law enforcement, or a child-welfare agency designated by the US Department of Justice. It further authorizes the US Center for SafeSport to ensure that aspiring US Olympic athletes can report allegations of abuse to an independent and non-conflicted entity for investigation and resolution, and to make sure that all national governing bodies follow the strictest standards for child abuse prevention and detection. The bill amends the Ted Stevens Olympic and Amateur Sports Act, under the Commerce Committee's jurisdiction, to expand the purposes of USOC to promote a safe environment in sports that is free from abuse.

SafeSport
As a direct result, the US Center for SafeSport was set up in 2017 under the auspices of the Protecting Young Victims from Sexual Abuse and Safe Sport Authorization Act of 2017. SafeSport is charged with addressing the problem of sexual abuse of minors and amateur athletes in sports. Its primary focus, as to which it has exclusive jurisdiction, is to review allegations of sexual misconduct, and to impose sanctions up to lifetime banning of a person from involvement in all Olympic sports. One function of SafeSport is to collate a central database of disciplinary cases across all sporting disciplines.

FBI failure to investigate and FBI false statements
"For more than a year, complaints to the FBI went unanswered and Nassar continued treating—and raping—gymnasts at MSU, a high school in Michigan, and a gymnastics club in Michigan." Four elite American gymnasts, McKayla Maroney, Simone Biles, Maggie Nichols, and Aly Raisman, testified before the US Senate on September 15, 2021, regarding the mishandling by FBI agents of abuse allegations brought against Nassar and how the agents made false statements regarding their reports and misinformation about the botched investigation. Maroney testified that she was met with silence by an FBI agent after telling the agent of Nassar's "molestations in extreme detail". She further stated that the FBI falsified her statement, that the agents involved should be indicted, and criticized Deputy Attorney General Lisa Monaco for not appearing at the hearing. Raisman testified that the FBI made her feel her "abuse didn't count" and "[I]t was like serving innocent children up to a pedophile on a silver platter." After the testimony by the gymnasts, FBI director Wray testified, speaking to the gymnasts that he was "deeply and profoundly sorry that so many people let you down over and over again". 

According to a report issued in July 2021 by the U.S. Department of Justice Inspector General Michael E. Horowitz, at least 70 more athletes were subject to abuse between the time of reports to the FBI and the arrest of Nassar by state authorities, while Nassar's victims stated that the number abused in that period was 120. The report identified retired FBI agent William Jay Abbott as having failed to act on the gymnasts' allegations, and later lying about doing so. The report further alleged that Stephen Penny, president of USA Gymnastics, discussed the possibility of finding Abbott a job at USA Gymnastics, while telling Abbott his concerns about the bad publicity that would be generated by the gymnast scandal.

See also
Athlete A and At the Heart of Gold – two documentaries about the Larry Nassar scandal.
Penn State child sex abuse scandal
Baylor University sexual assault scandal
2015 University of Louisville basketball sex scandal
Ohio State University abuse scandal
Sexual abuse in primary and secondary schools
Abuse in Gymnastics

References

2016 crimes in the United States
2016 scandals
2017 crimes in the United States
2017 scandals
Child abuse incidents and cases
Child sexual abuse in the United States
Gymnastics in the United States
Incidents of violence against girls
Michigan State University
Sexual assaults in the United States
Sexual harassment in the United States
Sexual misconduct allegations
Sports controversies
Sports scandals in the United States
Violence against women in the United States
Sexual assault in sports